The  is a war memorial commemorating the dead of the Pacific War located in Eastern Kyoto. The concrete and steel statue of the Bodhisattva Avalokiteśvara (Kannon) was built by Hirosuke Ishikawa (founder of Teisan Kanko Bus Co.,Ltd.) and unveiled on 8 June 1955. The statue is 24 m (80 ft) high and weighs approximately 500 tons.

The shrine beneath the statue contains an image of Bodhisattva Ekādaśamukha and images of the god of wind and god of thunder. Memorial tablets of 2 million Japanese who died in World War II are also stored here. Four times a day services are conducted in their memory. Also on the site is a memorial hall in honour of the unknown soldier killed in World War II.

Gallery

See also 
 Tomb of the Unknown Soldier

References 
 Ryozen Kannon, undated brochure from temple

External links 
 
 
 

Tourist attractions in Kyoto
World War II memorials in Japan
Buildings and structures in Kyoto
Monuments and memorials in Japan
Concrete Buddha statues
Colossal Buddha statues in Japan